Abbotsfield or Abbottsfield may refer to:

 Abbottsfield, Edmonton, a neighbourhood in Edmonton, Canada
 Abbotsfield, Tasmania, a suburb in Hobart, Tasmania
 Abbotsfield Secondary School, a school in London, England